Paul Thirlwell (born 13 February 1979) is an English former professional footballer who is assistant manager at Harrogate Town. He is also a former England U21 international.

Career
Thirlwell was born in Washington, Tyne and Wear, and began his career in Sunderland in August 1997. His first league game for Sunderland was against Tranmere Rovers on 22 August 1998. His only goal for Sunderland came against Luton Town on 19 September 2000 when Sunderland won 3–0 in the English League Cup. Thirlwell was on loan to Swindon Town from September 1999 to November 1999 and in those months he played 12 league games for the club from Wiltshire.

With Sunderland flying high in the Premiership, Thirlwell often found himself on the fringes of the first team, unable to break into the side ahead of established stars such as Don Hutchison and Stefan Schwarz. However, following the club's relegation from the top flight in 2003, Thirlwell went on to establish himself in the heart of Sunderland's midfield, making 33 league and cup appearances for the first team. Thirlwell even had a stint as captain after skipper Jason McAteer picked up an injury.

Despite a regular starting place during the first half of the season, injuries meant that Thirlwell missed a large chunk of the latter half of the campaign. Thirlwell also suffered a fractured skull during a reserve team match in April 2004, bringing a premature end to Thirlwell's Sunderland career.

With Thirlwell's contract up for renewal at the end of the season, manager Mick McCarthy decided not to retain him, and Thirlwell signed for Sheffield United on a free transfer in July 2004. His first appearance for this club came against Reading on 14 August 2004 and in a league game against Wolverhampton Wanderers on 27 November 2004 he scored his first goal for the club from South Yorkshire. Despite featuring 30 times for the club, Thirlwell played only one season for Sheffield United and on 5 August 2005 he signed for Derby County.

He made his debut for Derby on 6 August 2005 in a league game against Brighton & Hove Albion.

On 8 September 2006, Thirlwell joined Carlisle United on a 3-month loan from Derby County. after a lack of first team opportunities at Pride Park and his début for the Brunton Park team was on 9 September 2006 in a 1–1 draw against Northampton Town as a 54th minute sub. On 4 January 2007, Thirlwell re-joined Carlisle United on a permanent -year deal for an undisclosed fee. On 20 July 2007, Thirwell was named as Carlisle's new captain after the departure of Kevin Gray, manager Neil McDonald described Thirwell as the "prime candidate".

On 16 January 2009, Thirlwell scored his first league goal for Carlisle to equalise 2–2 against a second placed MK Dons team, Carlisle went on to win the match 3–2 through debutante Joe Anyinsah's goal.

On 2 May 2009, Thirlwell scored the winning goal against Millwall in Carlisle's final game of the season, a game Carlisle had to win to avoid relegation to League Two. The match ended Carlisle 2–0 Millwall. Thirlwell was released by the club at the end of the 2014–15 season, ending his nine-year association with the Cumbrian outfit.

On 28 May 2015, Thirlwell signed a contract with Harrogate Town.

Honours
Carlisle United
Football League Trophy: 2010–11; runner-up: 2009–10

References

External links

1979 births
Living people
People from Washington, Tyne and Wear
Footballers from Tyne and Wear
English footballers
Association football midfielders
Sunderland A.F.C. players
Swindon Town F.C. players
Sheffield United F.C. players
Derby County F.C. players
Carlisle United F.C. players
Premier League players
English Football League players
England under-21 international footballers
People from Springwell Village
Harrogate Town A.F.C. players